Republican Eagle may refer to: 
 the Coat of arms of Austria
the Coat of arms of Germany (Bundesadler)
the Egyptian Eagle of Saladin emblem
Red Wing Republican Eagle, a Minnesotan newspaper